New Denver is a village in British Columbia, Canada.

New Denver may also refer to:

 New Denver (album), an album by Motel Motel
 New Denver (Health Centre), in the list of heliports in Canada

See also
 Denver International Airport, the replacement for Stapleton International Airport, U.S.